There is a significant body of films that feature surveillance as a theme or as a plot arc. These are a number of these films produced in the United States and other countries.

List of films

References

Bibliography

External links
"No Such Agency": 11 movies that tried to warn us about the NSA at The AV Club

Films featuring surveillance, list of
Surveillance, list of films featuring
Articles containing video clips